Atlas Aglandjias is a Cypriot association football club based in Aglandjia, located in the Nicosia District. Its stadium is the Anagennisi Lythrodonta Ground and its colours are red and blue. It has 1 participation in Cypriot Fourth Division. Previous it has Futsal and Table tennis.

References
 

Football clubs in Cyprus
Association football clubs established in 1938
1938 establishments in Cyprus
Futsal clubs in Cyprus